Telega is a commune in Prahova County, Muntenia, Romania. It is composed of six villages: Boșilcești, Buștenari, Doftana, Melicești, Telega and Țonțești.

The river Doftana flows just west of commune, separating it from the city of Câmpina. The Purcaru is a left tributary of the Doftana; the confluence of the two rivers is in the village Doftana. The creek Sărata originates in Melicești and flows from northwest to southeast through Telega towards the river Teleajen. 

Doftana village is the site of the former Doftana prison. Telega railway station was the terminus of the former Câmpina–Câmpinița–Telega railway line.

Notes

Telega
Localities in Muntenia